Bezděkov nad Metují is a municipality and village in Náchod District in the Hradec Králové Region of the Czech Republic. It has about 600 inhabitants.

History
The first written mention of Bezděkov nad Metují is from 1358. It was probably founded before 1241.

Sights
There is the Baroque Church of Saint Procopius designed by architect Kilian Ignaz Dientzenhofer. It was built in 1724–1727.

References

External links

Villages in Náchod District